Epidemic is a 1987 Danish experimental medical dark comedy-horror film co-written and directed by Lars von Trier; it is the second installment of Trier's Europa trilogy, following The Element of Crime (1984) and succeeded by Europa (1991).

Co-written by Trier and Niels Vørsel, the film focuses on the screenwriting process. Vørsel and Trier play themselves, coming up with a last-minute script for a producer. The story is inter-cut with scenes from the film they write, in which Trier plays a renegade doctor trying to cure a modern-day epidemic. The film marks the first in a series of collaborations between Trier and Udo Kier.

Plot
In a metafiction version of the film, divided into five days. On the first day of the protagonists, screenwriters Lars and Niels lose the only copy of a film script (Kommisæren Og Luderen, "The Policeman and the Whore", a reference to The Element of Crime). They begin to write a new script about an epidemic: the outbreak of a plague-like disease. Another protagonist is a doctor, Mesmer, who, against the will of the Faculty of Medicine of an unknown city, goes to the countryside to help people. During the next days, the facts of the script join the real-life events in which a similar disease starts to spread. Lars and Niels go to Germany, where they meet a man who describes the Allied bombing of Cologne during the Second World War.

After the trip, Niels goes to a hospital where he undergoes a minor surgical procedure and while there tells Lars to go to see Palle, a pathologist who is performing an autopsy on a man who has recently died of an unknown disease. The last day, Lars and Niels have a dinner with their producer, to whom they reveal the end of the film, that Mesmer and his medical kit have spread the disease. The producer does not like the short twelve-page script, which has no violence, few deaths, and no subplots (which are common in Danish cinema). After that a hypnotist and a woman arrive in the house, to "help" writing the script, but the woman is overpowered by the visions of the script which are becoming real. She commits suicide with a fork, then another woman who shares the house with Lars and Niels dies too, and Niels begins showing the signs of the disease.

Cast
Excluding his portrayal of von Trier as Dr. Mesmer, most of the film's cast portray fictionalized versions of themselves:

 Lars von Trier
 Niels Vørsel
 Allan De Waal
 Ole Ernst
 Michael Gelting
 Colin Gilder
 Svend Ali Hamann
 Claes Kastholm Hansen
 Ib Hansen
 Anja Hemmingsen
 Kirsten Hemmingsen
 Cæcilia Holbek
 Gert Holbek
 Udo Kier
 Jørgen Christian Krüff
 Jan Kornum Larsen
 Gitte Lind
 Leif Magnusson

Reception
The film was screened in the Un Certain Regard section at the 1987 Cannes Film Festival. It was nominated for Best Film at the Fantasporto International Fantasy Film Festival in 1988.

On Rotten Tomatoes, the film has a rating of 27%, based on 7 reviews, with an average rating of 5.4/10. On Metacritic, the film holds a score of 66 out of 100, based on 4 reviews, indicating "generally favorable reviews".

Robert K. Elder of the Chicago Tribune gave the film 3 out of 4, and wrote: "Will never be confused with von Trier's great films. But it is an intriguing introduction to his later cinematic obsessions". The Village Voice called the film "among [Lars von Trier's] better and most revealing movies". Chicago Reader gave the film 3 out of 5, and wrote: "Aside from the Pirandellian games and some interplay of different film stocks there isn't much going on here, though von Trier rewards the patient with a strange and horrifying climax".

See also
 Rat king (folklore)
 Bubonic plague

References

External links
 
 
 
 

1987 films
1987 horror films
1987 drama films
1980s horror drama films
Danish avant-garde and experimental films
Danish horror drama films
1980s Danish-language films
1980s English-language films
Films directed by Lars von Trier
Films about filmmaking
Films about viral outbreaks
Films set in Denmark
Films shot in Denmark
Films set in West Germany
1987 multilingual films
Danish multilingual films
1980s black comedy films
1980s comedy films
1987 comedy films